Gar Tsenyen Gungton (? – 695) was a general of the Tibetan Empire. He was the fifth son of minister Gar Tongtsen Yulsung. In Chinese records, his name was given as Bólùn Zànrèn or Lùn Zànrèn, both attempted to transliterate the short form of his title and name, Lön Tsenyen.

In 692, the Tang Chinese troops invaded Tibet in order to recapture the lost land: Four Garrisons of Anxi. Gungton fought together with his brothers Trinring Tsendro, Tagu Risum, and Western Turks' khan Ashina Tuizi. Tibetan was defeated in the battle. Two years later, Tibetean was defeated by Chinese general Wang Xiaojie near Qinghai Lake, Gungton and Ashina Tuizi had to flee back to Tibet.

The young king Tridu Songtsen had realised that members of the Gar family had become independent warlords and posed a threat to the central authority of the king for a long time. Tridu Songtsen was very angry about this defeat and tried to weaken their influence, and Gungton realised it soon. According to Old Tibetan Annals, Gungton launched a rebellion against the young king in the next year. The young king led troops personally, quickly put down the rebellion. Gungton was captured and executed.

References
Old Tibetan Annals (version I), P.T. 1288
New Book of Tang, vol. 230

7th-century Tibetan people
People of the Tibetan Empire
695 deaths
Tibetan military leaders
Tang–Tibet relations